These hits topped the Ultratop 50 in the Flanders region of Belgium in 1994.

See also
1994 in music

References

1994 in Belgium
1994 record charts
1994